IHOS Music Theatre and Opera is a Tasmanian opera company was established in Hobart in 1990, by composer and artistic director Constantine Koukias, and production director Werner Ihlenfeld to create original music-theatre and opera works.

Major repertoire
Olegas - by Constantine Koukias, Libretto by Natasha Cica
Tesla - Lightning in His Hand. - An opera in two parts, sung in English By Constantine Koukias.
The Divine Kiss (Das Böse ist Immer und Überall) - An opera sung in Modern and Ecclesiastical Greek, Hebrew, German and English by Constantine Koukias. Dedicated to the memory of Józef Wawrzynczak
To Traverse Water - An Opera in Two Parts Sung in Ecclesiastical & Modern Greek by Constantine Koukias
Days and Nights with Christ - An opera by Constantine Koukias
Prayer Bells - A concert piece by Constantine Koukias
The Lunch Box - A chamber opera by Thanapoom Sirichang, sung in Thai

IHOS Music Theatre Laboratory
In late 1999 IHOS formed the IHOS Music Theatre Laboratory, a sub-section of the main company that provides training for young opera / music-theatre performers, as well as commissioning and collaborative opportunities for Australian composers, directors and designers.

Works premiered
2007 As if Electronically Controlled (Full Premiere) Christopher Williams
2007 Colonial Pictures Simon Reade
2006 As if Electronically Controlled (Workshop only) Christopher Williams
2005 The Death of Chatterton Matthew Dewey
2005 Da Ponte in Absentia Constantine Koukias
2004 Blood Lights Ian Cresswell
2004 A Priest's Passion Matthew Dewey
2004 Succubus Michael Lampard
2004 For No Apparent Reason Myles Griffith
2003 The Fall of the House of Usher Maria Grenfell
2003 Creatures of the Wind Kate Moore
2003 Scenes from a Calabrese Opera Angelina Zucco
2002 Eden's Bequest (second stage) Rosemary Austen
2002 Harmony Allan Badalassi 
2002 Touch Wood Claudio Pompili
2002 Antigone Sketches Constantine Koukias
2002 POP Sally Rees, Matt Warren
2002 A Lizard Between Her Breasts Raffaele Marcellino
2001 Happy New Ears Graeme Leak
2001 Death by Defenestration Joe Bugden
2001 Eden's Bequest Rosemary Austen
2001 Sway Lisa Morisset
2001 Slip - Synthetic Spaces Christos Linou Hugh Covill
2000 Images from the Life of Nikola Tesla Constantine Koukias
2000 The Tesla Project Constantine Koukias

Notable Laboratory Alumni
Matthew Dewey - Composer
Rachel Wenona Guy - Performer, Singer, Writer, Visual Artist
Sarah Jones - Singer
Michael Lampard - Singer and Composer
Craig Wood - Performer and Composer
Christos Linou - Performer / Choreographer

External links
IHOS Music Theatre and Opera
The Tasmanian Composers Collective

Tasmanian musical groups
Australian opera companies
Musical groups established in 1990